Drug induced pigmentation may take on many different appearances, one of the most common being a change in the color, or pigmentation, of the skin.

Presentation

Cause
Drug-induced pigmentation of the skin may occur as a consequence of drug administration, and the mechanism may be postinflammatory hyperpigmentation in some cases, but frequently is related to actual deposition of the offending drug in the skin.The incidence of this change varies, and depends on the type of medication involved.  Some of the most common drugs involved are NSAIDs, antimalarials, psychotropic drugs, Amiodarone, cytotoxic drugs, tetracyclines, and heavy metals such as silver and gold (which must be ingested, not just worn).

Pathophysiology
There are 4 possible mechanisms to how this change may occur:
 Accumulation of melanin, the skin pigment
 Accumulation of drug or one of its products under any layer of the skin (usually the dermis or epidermis)
 Accumulation of iron throughout the dermis from drug-induced post-inflammatory changes
 The synthesis of special pigments, under direct influence of the drug

See also
Skin lesion

References

External links 

 

Drug eruptions
Drug-induced diseases